Paul M. Viggiano (born February 17, 1943) is an American politician who served in the New York State Assembly from the 62nd district from 1979 to 1982.

References

1943 births
Living people
Democratic Party members of the New York State Assembly